Ras Asan Olugbenga (commonly known as Ras Asan) born as Derric James Studamire in Cleveland, Ohio (1990) is the co-founder of BREAUX and Company, a private equity social enterprise that is the majority shareholder and operator of BREAUX Capital, Million Dollar Scholar, DQ and Partners, and Techgroove Fest.

As the co-founder of and Co-Founder/Chief Marketing Officer of BREAUX Capital, the first financial technology startup for Black men, which provides a financial health platform where members can pool their capital, invest collectively, and gain financial knowledge via peer networks. Ras was featured on the Black Enterprise's 2017 List of 100 Modern Men and named to the Inc. Magazine list of 30 Under 30 companies.

Early life and education 
Delving into entrepreneurship at age 16, he developed a sustainable landscaping operation that gainfully employed himself and a handful of family members by age 17. He credits "Premier Mowers" for being his first taste of "equity, time freedom, and creative control".  Throughout grade school he was known to be enterprising and started several ventures with friends who went on to pursue entrepreneurship after high school as well. In 2013, Ras graduated cum laude from Morehouse College as a member of several honor societies including the Golden Key Honor Society, National Society of Collegiate Scholars and the International Sociological Honor Society, Alpha Kappa Delta.

Entrepreneurship 
With Derrius Quarles, his business partner and Morehouse classmate, Ras was chosen to participate in over 5 notable business accelerator programs. Together, Ras & Derrius were recognized for breaking racial barriers in the New Orleans tech startup community. Ras was also awarded a StartingBloc fellowship(), as acknowledgment for being an agent of change in his home community and across the country. Ras Asan and Derrius Quarles have partnered on numerous ventures ranging from tech startups, co-hosting The Bridge radio show, community-based social ventures, private investments, and brand strategy consulting.

Community Activism 
Upon completion of his degree, he again jumped into entrepreneurship and with Morehouse classmates where he spearheaded the development of the Mogul Minds financial wealth-building curriculum to teach middle school and high school students the basic tenets of wealth-building via culturally relevant business development and investing examples and activities. Ras was also invited to join the board of the Concerned Citizen's Community Center in his hometown of Cleveland, Ohio. Alongside Marion "Nita" Gardner, Ras was able to help expand the budget of the Housing Dispute & Resolution Initiative to combat the emergence of blighted properties in his home community of Mount Pleasant.

References

Businesspeople from Cleveland
African-American businesspeople
Morehouse College alumni
Living people
Year of birth missing (living people)
21st-century African-American people